Olympic Sports Center station, originally in the plan, it was called Guangyuan Road station. This is a planned elevated three-story subway station with an island platform. The station is served for Line 4 of Ningbo Rail Transit as a destination terminal which was started to construct since 2015.

Platform Style 
Olympic Sports Center station is located in Jiangbei District, immediately below Beiwaihuanlu (Northern Outer Ring Road) elevated road. The station is an elevated island platform station with following characteristics: 120m length, 20.6m width for the station and 12.8m width for the platform. The total construction area is 7,555 sq meters.

Exits 
It has been set four exits.

References 

Railway stations in Zhejiang
Railway stations in China opened in 2020
Ningbo Rail Transit stations